The International Union for the Protection of New Varieties of Plants or UPOV is a treaty body (non-United Nations intergovernmental organization) with headquarters in Geneva, Switzerland. Its objective is to provide an effective system for plant variety protection. It does so by defining a blueprint regulation to be implemented by its members in national law. The expression UPOV Convention also refers to one of the three instruments that relate to the union, namely the 1991 Act of the UPOV Convention (UPOV 91), 1978 Act of the UPOV Convention (UPOV 78) and 1961 Act of the UPOV Convention with Amendments of 1972 (UPOV 61).

History 
UPOV was established by the International Convention for the Protection of New Varieties of Plants (UPOV 61). The convention was adopted in Paris in 1961 and revised in 1972, 1978 and 1991.

The initiative for the foundation of UPOV came from European breeding companies, who 1956 called for a conference to define basic principles for plant variety protection. The first version of the UPOV convention was ratified in 1961 by six western industrialised countries: Denmark, France, Germany, the Netherlands, Sweden and the United Kingdom. By 1990 still only 14 countries were part of the convention, with apartheid South Africa being the only country from the Southern Hemisphere. From the mid-1990s more and more countries from Latin America, Asia and Africa joined the convention. A reason for this development might be the TRIPS-Agreement that obliged WTO members to introduce plant variety protection in national law. Later, many countries have been obliged to join UPOV through specific clauses in bilateral trade agreements, in particular with the EU, USA, Japan and EFTA. The TRIPS-Agreement doesn't require adherence to UPOV but gives the possibility to define a sui generis system for plant variety protection. In contrast, clauses in free trade agreement are more comprehensive and typically require adherence to UPOV.

While the earlier versions of the convention have been replaced, UPOV 78 and UPOV 91 coexist. Existing members are free to decide whether they want to ratify UPOV 91 or stay with UPOV 78, whereas new members have to adhere to the more restrictive version from 1991.

Membership 

For a country or intergovernmental organisation to become member, it needs to implement the requirements of the actual convention in national law. UPOV's secretariat analyises the regulation of plant variety protection in national law and writes a recommendation to the council whether or not the applicant shall be granted membership. In the past several countries have been refused memberships because their national plant variety protection laws granted exceptions for subsistence farmers to reuse and exchange seeds.

System of protection 
The convention defines both how the organization must be governed and run, and the basic concepts of plant variety protection that must be included in the domestic laws of the members of the union. These concepts include:

 The criteria for new varieties to be protected: novelty, distinctness, uniformity, and stability.
 The process for application for a grant.
 Intellectual property rights conferred to an approved breeder.
 Exceptions to the rights conferred to the breeder.
 Required duration of breeder's right.
 Events in which a breeder's rights must be declared null and void.

In order to be granted breeder's rights, the variety in question must be shown to be new. This means that the plant variety cannot have previously been available for more than one year in the applicant's country, or for more than four years in any other country or territory. The variety must also be distinct (D), that is, easily distinguishable through certain characteristics from any other known variety (protected or otherwise). The other two criteria, uniformity (U) and stability (S), mean that individual plants of the new variety must show no more variation in the relevant characteristics than one would naturally expect to see, and that future generations of the variety through various propagation means must continue to show the relevant distinguishing characteristics. The UPOV offers general guidelines for DUS testing.

A breeder can apply for rights for a new variety in any union member country, and can file in as many countries as desired without waiting for a result from previous applications. Protection only applies in the country in which it was granted, so there are no reciprocal protections unless otherwise agreed by the countries in question. There is a right of priority, and the application date of the first application filed in any country is the date used in determining priority.

The rights conferred to the breeder are similar to other intellectual property rights, such as patents, even though there are important differences. Their purpose is to create a temporary monopoly on a plant variety, to allow its breeder to redeem the costs he invested to create this innovation - typically the creation of a new variety takes 10 to 15 years and implies a substantial investment. The breeder must authorize any actions taken in propagating the new variety, including selling and marketing, importing and exporting, keeping stock of, and reproducing. This means that the breeder can, for example, require a licensing fee for any company interested in reproducing his variety for sale. The breeder also has the right to name the new variety, based on certain guidelines that prevent the name from being deliberately misleading or too similar to another variety's name.

In the 1991 convention there are four exceptions to the rights of the breeder owning a plant variety:

 Breeders exception: Even if a variety is protected it can be freely used by an other breeder as a source for new varieties, without the authorization of the owner of the original variety. With the introduction of the 1991 convention this exception has been narrowed down to exclude "essentially derived varieties".
 Farmers exception: In the 1978 Convention the reproduction of seeds, as well as their exchange with other farmers is implicitly allowed, because the exclusive right of the breeder only extend to the production for the purpose of marketing. With the 1991 Convention the scope of breeders rights were expanded to include the multiplication of a variety. However, there still is an optional exception that can be included in national legislation to allow reproduction of seeds by farmers, but only "within reasonable limits and subject to the safeguarding of the legitimate interests of the breeder" which practically means that the farmers is obliged to pay license fees to the breeder. The only member of UPOV 91 still allowing the free reproduction of seeds for some species by farmers is Switzerland. UPOV secretariat never assessed if this implementation is in line with the convention as Switzerland was already member of UPOV 1978 and national laws are only analysed for new members and not for existing members who update from UPOV 78 to UPOV 91.
 Exception for private use: While free private use is implicitly allowed in UPOV 78, in UPOV 91 a mandatory explicit exception has been introduced. It allows the reproduction of protected varieties for private use, by amateur gardeners as well as by subsistence farmers. However, the exception only exclusively for the production of a food crop to be consumed by that farmer or gardener. In any case the exchange or gift of seeds or propagating material of protected varieties are prohibited.
 Exception for research: Acts done for experimental purpose are excluded from the scope of breeders rights UPOV 91, something that was implicit in UPOV 78.

The 1991 Convention specifies that the breeder's right must be granted for at least 20 years from grant date for perennial crops and at least 25 years in the case of varieties of trees or vines. In the 1978 convention minimum duration of breeders rights are 15 years for perennials and 18 years for trees and vines.

Finally, there are provisions for how to negate granted breeders' rights if the rights are determined to be unfounded. That is, if it is discovered after the application has been granted that the variety is not actually novel or distinct, or if it is discovered to not be uniform or stable, the breeder's rights are nullified. In addition, if it is discovered that the person who applied for protection of the variety is not the actual breeder, the rights are nullified unless they can be transferred to the proper person. If it is discovered after a period of protection that the variety is no longer uniform and stable, the breeder's rights are canceled.

WIPO Lex provides support for related IP legal collections, including UPOV Lex.

Conflicts between breeders' rights and peasants' rights 
Several international standards enacted by the United Nations oblige their member states to protect the rights of farmers to seeds: Article 19 of the UN Declaration on the Rights of Peasants and Other People Working in Rural Areas  (UNDROP) grants peasants "The right to save, use, exchange and sell their farm-saved seed or propagating material." The same right is also codified in Article 9 of the International Treaty for Plant Genetic Resources for Agriculture (ITPGRFA). Furthermore, peasants rights to seeds are also mentioned in the Convention for Biological Diversity and the UN Declaration on the Rights of Indigenous Peoples. UPOV standards violate this rights in the case of protected varieties, as farmers only are allowed to save seeds within very narrow limits and are not allowed to exchange or sell any seeds at all, according to UPOV 91. Furthermore, as implementation of UPOV is based on predefined standards, there is little room for member states to fulfill their obligation to take into account possible effects on the human right situation in their countries and to allow for participation of farmers. In many developing countries, small scale farmers have not beem informed prior to adopting and implementation of new plant variety protection laws and had no possibility participate in these decisions.

As UNDROP and UNDRIP are part of Human Rights standards, they are higher order norms and therefore they prevail over property rights on seeds, according to human rights experts. As a consequence, states are obliged to revise regulations in national law that violate peasant's rights and adapt trade agreement or other intergovernmental obligations such as UPOV.

In a report on seeds and farmers' rights to the Human Rights Council, Special Rapporteur for the right to food Michael Fakhri states that UPOV 91 violates farmers' rights. The report denounces pressures applied by industrialised countries on countries of the global South to join UPOV. It calls on UN member states to design and interpret seed policies and plant variety protection laws in a way that protects farmers rights and promotes farmers' seed systems rather than restricting them. Ethiopia, India, Malaysia and Thailand (all non-UPOV members) are mentioned as positive examples.

Impacts of UPOV

Impacts on development of seed sector and accessibility of seeds 
A study published by UPOV in 2005 evaluated the impact of UPOV compliant regulations in Argentina, China, Kenya, Poland and South Korea. The study found that in these countries the number of protected varieties of some crops has increased after these countries have joined UPOV. The report takes this as an indicator that farmers and the agricultural sector as whole has profited. However, the by far does not live up to the scientific standards for impact assessments and has been criticized being heavily biased.

A report from 2005 commissioned by the World Bank looked at the impact of intellectual property rights regimes on the plant breeding industry in 5 developing countries. It concludes that intellectual property regimes have relatively little effect on the emergence of the private seed sector. India, the country with the most dynamic seed sector analysed in the report, is not a member of UPOV and has no strict plant variety protection regime. Contrarily, the report states that farmer's seed systems are the main source of seeds and new varieties in the countries studied and that strict intellectual property rights on seeds may reduce the effectiveness of these systems. An analysis of the data from the Access to Seed Index from 2019, came to a similar finding: Many of the developing having the most vibrant private seed sector are not member of UPOV but have their own system of plant variety protection or no plant variety protection at all.

A study published by NGOs looked at the effects of the implementation of UPOV 1991 in francophone Africa in the 11 years after the accession of OAPI to UPOV. It found that in the 17 member countries only 117 plant varieties have been newly protected during this period, half of them had already lapsed because of nonpayment of fees. At least half of them were varieties that had been available before. The study finds no increase in plant breeding activities in the region; while breeding by the public sector continued independent of plant variety protection, breeding by private companies remained largely non-existent.

In the case of Iceland, no new variety has been protected since its accession to UPOV 91 in 2006, while 49 varieties had been newly protected in the 10 years before.

An increased number of protected varieties does not automatically increase the accessibility of seeds to farmers. In many developing countries the majority of seeds used by small scale farmers come from the farmers’ managed seed sector. Frequently, also seeds of protected varieties are saved, exchanged and sold. As these practices are prohibited in UPOV 91, farmers lose access to an inexpensive source of seeds while commercial seeds remain unaffordable for many.

Impacts on agricultural development and productivity 
A study commissioned by UPOV examined the socioeconomic benefits of plant variety protection, 10 years after the accession of Viet Nam to UPOV 91. The study found that the productivity of 3 major staple crops increased during this period: Yield gains were 18% for rice, 30% for corn and 43% for sweet potato. The study argues that improved varieties which had been introduced due to stricter plant variety protection contributed to this development, and that 74 million people could be fed with the additional sweet potatoes. However, in the case of sweet potato that had the highest gain, no new variety had been protected and also for the other crops, productivity gains can be explained with other factors.  A Study published by an Asian NGO finds that implementation of UPOV 91 in Vietnam did not lead to an increase of investment in breeding or in gains of productivity. Instead, it strengthened international commercial breeders at the cost of weakening the public breeders and threatening the farmers' seed sector.

Impacts on food security and poverty reduction 
Smallholder farmers in the global South are amongst the groups most prone to poverty and hunger. They predominantly rely on seeds that are produced by farmers themselves, often also including varieties originally bred by public and private breeders. These farmers’ seed systems are often highly resilient and more accessible to famers than seeds offered by breeding companies. Through the implementation of strict plant variety protection in line with UPOV 91, and the restrictions on the use, exchange and sale of farm-saved seeds, farmers become more dependent on the seeds offered by breeding companies which often are unaffordable for the most vulnerable groups. As a consequence, adherence to UPOV would most likely have negative effects for poverty reduction and food security in developing countries.

The risk for food security that come with the implementation of strict regulations for plant variety protection might be an important reason why many countries of the global South hesitate to join UPOV or to update from UPOV 78 to UPOV 91 (APBREBES 2021).

The UN Special Rapporteur on the Right to Food, Olivier De Schutter, came to similar findings in his study of UPOV in 2009. He found that IP-related Monopoly rights could cause poor farmers to become "increasingly dependent on expensive inputs" and at risk of indebtedness. Further, the system risks neglecting poor farmers’ needs in favour of agribusiness needs, jeopardising traditional systems of seed saving and exchange, and losing biodiversity to "the uniformization encouraged by the spread of commercial varieties.

In a report from 2009 the UN Special Rapporteur on the Right to Food, Olivier De Schutter, analysed the impact of UPOV on the right to food. He found that IP-related Monopoly rights could cause poor farmers to become "increasingly dependent on expensive inputs" and at risk of indebtedness. Further, the system risks neglecting poor farmers’ needs in favour of agribusiness needs, jeopardising traditional systems of seed saving and exchange, and losing biodiversity to "the uniformization encouraged by the spread of commercial varieties".These findings were by his successor Michael Fakhri in a report from 2022 and by the UN Secretary-General in a report from 2015.

The risk for food security that come with the implementation of strict regulations for plant variety protection might be an important reason why many countries of the global South hesitate to join UPOV or to update from UPOV 78 to UPOV 91 (APBREBES 2021) as the latter puts narrow limits to the farmer's privilege to reuse farm saved seeds.

Impacts on biodiversity and genetic resources 
Diverse genetic resources are the basis of all plant breeding and crop production. Breeders rely on farmers’ varieties and wild relatives as a source for interesting traits, such as resistance against pathogens and pests. The number of varieties has decreased by 75% in the past century and there is far less area planted to landraces worldwide as these have been replaced by scientifically bread varieties. Furthermore, crop genetic diversity may decline with concentration of area planted in a few favoured varieties and reductions in “genetic distance” between these varieties. The increasing dominance of few global seed producers and the implementation of increasingly strict plant variety regulation might have played a key role in this development. As the UN's Secretary General stated in a report from 2015, restrictions on seed management systems linked to UPOV 91 can lead to a loss of biodiversity and in turn harm the livelihoods of small-scale farmers as well as weaken the genetic base on which we all depend for our future supply of food.

The design of plant variety protection facilitates appropriation of genetic resources and biopiracy. Due to the criteria defined by UPOV, most landraces and farmer varieties cannot be protected and are therefore open for appropriation. UPOV 91-based PVP law also does not include a requirement for applicants to disclose the origin of their material and prove that the plant genetic resources used in the breeding process were legally acquired. In its guidlelines, UPOV even explicitly forbids its members to request a declaration of lawful acquirement or prior informed consent (as required by the Convention on Biological Diversity) as precondition for granting PVP. 

The documentation of a case in West Africa shows that the risk of biopiracy is real: A French seed company tempted to claim plant variety protection for the traditional onion variety “Violette de Galmi”. The claim was challenged by the Nigerien government, the seed company withdrew the application and submitted a new application for the same variety but under another name. The fact that challenging the application was only possible because the seed company used the original name of the traditional variety shows how easily varieties can be appropriated.

Critics and resistance 

However, several Social movements and civil society organisations such as Oxfam, Third World Network and Via Campesina have pointed out the resistance of the UPOV Secretariat and Member States to dialogue with all interested parties, in particular:
 by keeping meetings secret,
 by not making its documents publicly available,
 by refusing farmers' organisations NGO observer status with UPOV.

A recent study by Professor Graham Dutfield concluded that UPOV's governance falls short in many different ways, UPOV officials know very little about actual farming, and how small-scale farmers actually develop new varieties and produce them, and that they knew much more about breeding, which favours commercial breeders. The UPOV system thus favours commercial breeders over farmers and producers, and private interests over public interests.

See also

Internal links
 Community Plant Variety Office (CPVO)
 Plant Variety Protection Act of 1970
 Protection of Plant Varieties and Farmers' Rights Act, 2001
 "Plant variety" (the legal term) vs. "variety" (the botanical taxonomy term)
 International Treaty on Plant Genetic Resources for Food and Agriculture (Plant Treaty, or ITPGRFA)
 Convention on Biological Diversity (CBD)
 Nagoya Protocol on Access to Genetic Resources and the Fair and Equitable Sharing of Benefits Arising from their Use (Nagoya Protocol)
 United Nations Declaration on the Rights of Peasants (UNDROP)
 Bioprospecting and biopiracy
 Plant genetic resources (PGR)
 World Intellectual Property Organization (WIPO)

External links 

List of UPOV members, with date of accession and respective act of the convention to which it is party
Association for Plant Breeding for the Benefit of Society (APBREBES), civil society organisation with observer status to UPOV 
SWISSAID Foundation

Notes and references 

Bioethics
Botany
Plant genetics
Commercialization of traditional medicines
Biological patent law
Intellectual property organizations
Intergovernmental organizations established by treaty
Organizations established in 1968
Organisations based in Geneva